Jimmy Kunal Nanda is an Indian actress and model. She won the title of Mrs India in 2007. Nanda made her TV debut in the famous detective series CID, where she played the role of Inspector Lavanya in 2008.

Biography
Nanda hails from Ahmedabad. She was crowned as Gladsrag Mrs. India 2007. Later, she took part in Mrs. Universe 2007 and became runner-up of this competition.

Later, Nanda acted in C.I.D. where she portrayed the role of Inspector Lavanya. She was last seen in the episode no.558. Later, she appeared in a Gujarati film titled Tuu To Gayo which was released in 2016. She also appeared in Ratanpur 2018 which was released in 2018.

Filmography

Television

Film

References

Living people
Actresses in Gujarati cinema
Actresses in Hindi television
Female models from Gujarat
Year of birth missing (living people)